The Music of Andalusia encompasses a range of traditional and modern musical genres which originate in the territory of Andalusia in southern Spain. The most famous are copla and flamenco, the latter being sometimes used as a portmanteau term for various regional musical traditions within Andalusia. Today, Andalusia has a rich and thriving musical scene, which draws from its own musical traditions as well as from external influences such as salsa, jazz or pop music.

Historical influences on Andalusian music
Andalusia was probably the main route of transmission of a number of Near-Eastern musical instruments used in classical music; the rebec (ancestor of violin) from the Maghreb rebab, the guitar from qitara and naker from naqareh. Further terms fell into disuse in Europe; adufe from al-duff, alboka from al-buq, anafil from al-nafir, exabeba from al-shabbaba (flute), atabal (bass drum) from al-tabl, atambal from al-tinbal,
the shawm and dulzaina from the reed instruments  and al-zurna,

According to historical sources, William VIII, the father of William, brought to Poitiers hundreds of Muslim prisoners. Trend acknowledges that the troubadors derived their sense of form and the subject matter of their poetry from Andalusia. The hypothesis that the troubador tradition was created, more or less, by William after his experience of Moorish arts while fighting with the Reconquista in Spain was also championed by Ramón Menéndez Pidal in the early twentieth-century, but its origins go back to the Cinquecento and Giammaria Barbieri (died 1575) and Juan Andrés (died 1822). Meg Bogin, English translator of the female troubadors, also held this hypothesis. Certainly "a body of song of comparable intensity, profanity and eroticism [existed] in Arabic from the second half of the 9th century onwards." Grove Dictionary of Music and Musicians, edited 
 
Andalusia is a modern autonomous community of Spain that is best known for flamenco, a form of music and dance, mostly performed by artists and ordinary people from Andalusia.

Improvised flamenco songs of ancient Andalusian origin are called cante jondo, and are characterized by a reduced tonal ambiance, a strict rhythm, baroque ornamentation and repetition of notes. Cante jondo is sung by a single singer (cantaor).

Structure
There are two forms of flamenco songs: cante jondo and cante chico. Cante jondo are slower and usually feature sad lyrics about disappointed love or death, while cante chico are much quicker, more popular and dance-oriented.  The concept of duende is very important in flamenco.  Loosely, defined, duende is a spiritual or emotional bond between the performer and audience, created by the performer's intense concentration and passion.

There are multiple styles (palos) of flamenco, including:
fandango
fandangos de Huelva
granadínos - from Granada
malagueñas - from Málaga
saeta
sevillana
siguiriyas
soleares
Tangos

The guitar is a vital instrument to flamenco; it marks the measure of a song, and is frequently used in expressive solos during which the guitarist will improvise short variations called falsetas. Ramón Montoya was the most influential early guitarist, known for having solidified the guitar as a solo instrument.  His successors included Manolo Sanlúcar and Paco de Lucía.

History
The golden age of flamenco is said to be 1869 to 1910, later becoming more and more popularized internationally and influenced by South American music, especially the tango.  Musicians from the golden age performed at bars called café cantantes, such as Café de Chinitas in Málaga, which was made famous by the poetry of García Lorca.  Other musicians of the early 20th century include Manolo Caracol, who walked from Jerez to participate in a cante jondo competition, which he won.

Though the golden age had long since passed, the 1950s saw flamenco achieving increased respectability in Spain. Hispavox, a Spanish record label, released Antología del Cante Flamenco in 1956; the recording's collection of most all of the greatest flamenco singers was very popular.  In 1956, the first national cante jondo competition was held in Cordoba, followed by a Chair of Flamencology being established at Jerez in 1958.

In the late 1950s and early 1960s, Antonio Mairena and similar artists kelped kickstart a flamenco revival as American and British rock began dominating the Spanish music scene.  Emerging from this, Camarón de la Isla became one of the most popular and critically acclaimed performers of the century.  His 1969 debut Con la Colaboracion Especial de Paco de Lucia inspired a new generation of performers that invented Nuevo Flamenco.

In the 1970s and 80s, salsa, blues, rumba and other influences were added to flamenco, along with music from India. Ketama's 1988 debut, Ketama, was especially influential.  At the beginning of the 1990s, the Madrid label Nuevos Medios became closely associated with the new flamenco fusion music, which came to be called nuevo flamenco.

See also

Music of Spain

References

^ Haïm Zafrani (2002). Juifs d'Andalousie et du Maghreb . Maisonneuve & Larose. p. 228. .
^ Rachid Aous; Mohammed Habib Samrakandi (2002). Musiques d'Algérie . 47. Presses Univ. du Mirail. .
^ María Rosa Menocal; Raymond P. Scheindlin; Michael Anthony Sells (2000). The literature of Al-Andalus . title=Cambridge history of Arabic literature. 4 Arabic literature to the end of the Umayyad period (illustrated ed.). Cambridge University Press. pp. 72–73. .
^ Arab-Andalusian Music of Morocco during the Centuries / scientific publication of D. Eisenberg (Hispanic Journal of Philosophy 1988) 
^ (Farmer 1978, p. 137)
^ (Farmer 1978, p. 140)
^ (Farmer 1978, pp. 140–1)
^ (Farmer 1978, p. 141)
^ (Farmer 1978, p. 142)
^ (Farmer 1978, p. 143)
^ (Farmer 1978, p. 144)
^ M. Guettat (1980), La Musique classique du Maghreb (Paris: Sindbad).
^ J. B. Trend (1965), Music of Spanish History to 1600 (New York: Krause Reprint)
^ Bogin, Meg. The Women Troubadours. Scarborough: Paddington, 1976. .
^ "Troubadour", Grove Dictionary of Music and Musicians, edited by Stanley Sadie, London: Macmillan Press

External links 
Other examples of music from Andalusia
Juifs et musique Arabo Andalouse 1
Juifs et musique Arabo Andalouse 2

Bibliography

Andalusia
Andalusian music